Palliyadi is a panchayat town in Kanniyakumari district in Indian state of Tamil Nadu. Tamil is the official language spoken; It has been a centre of life for many centuries and have been predominantly occupied by wealthy aristocrat Christian Nadars and Nair families. The majority of the population is Christian. The town has produced leading intellectuals, administrators, Judges, IPS officers, IAS officers, MPs and MLAs who have served the country and have contributed substantially in the fields of politics, education, literature, art, poetry, socio-religious and social reformation. The leading land and revenue administrators, during the reign of the Travancore Kingdom where, based out of Palliyadi families. The Father of Kanniyakumari District Mr.Marshal Nesamony was a native of this town. The nearest accessible station is the railway station that goes under the same name.

Notable people
 Dr.Gunamudian David Boaz – Oxford University alumni and First Indian Psychologist. Also served as the Head of Department Madras University from 1938 to 1956.
 Dr. A.S. Johnson – Cambridge University alumni. First director of Trivandrum Mental Hospital (1933 - 1938). Former Director of Madras Medical College, from 1943 to 1957. Founder Indian Psychiatric Society, Delhi (1947).
 Dr. G. Manuel - Chief Surgeon, Neyyoor Mission Hospital (1879 - 1919).
 Dr. Vedhamonikam - Founder cum director, Marthandam Mission Hospital (1881 - 1895).
 M. Sajjanam - Travancore State Judge (1918 - 1956) and Founder of Nagercoil Bar Association (1916 - 1918).
 N. Paul Vasanthakumar – Chief Justice of Jammu & Kashmir. 
 Dr.Charles Kamalam Job – Indian scientist and former director CMC
 Marshal Nesamony – former MP and freedom fighter.
 Raja Kesavadas – Dewan of Travancore from 1789 to 1798. 
 William MLA – Six-time Vilavancode MLA, from 1947 to 1967.
 James MLA – Four-time Tiruvattar MLA, from 1962 to 1977.
 N.Wilson Appolos – Two-time Member of Legislative Council
 C. Livingstone – Renowned Indian scientist.
 Devasahayam Pillai – Travancore Kingdom Court judge.
 H. Jayapal - Former Advocate General of Tamil Nadu.
 Sam Nathaniel – Freedom fighter and founder of Travancore Tamil Nadu Congress.
 Dr. John D.K. Sundersingh – former Principal, Scott Christian College.
 Ponniah. S.P – 1938 batch IPS Officer.
 Mallan Sankaran Nair – Travancore Chief-Land Revenue Administrator.
 W. Swamidhas – Founder, Dhas Motors.
 A. Amalraj - Inspector-general of police, Chennai.
 J. Nesamony - Founder of Nesamony Memorial Christian College, Marthandam.

Religious

Cristucovil CSI Church
Kristukovil London Mission Church
The Salvation Army Church
Sacred Heart Roman Catholic Church

References

Villages in Kanyakumari district
Cities and towns in Kanyakumari district